Beinn Airigh Charr (792 m) is a mountain in the Northwest Highlands of Scotland. It lies in Wester Ross, on the northern side of Loch Maree, near to the village of Poolewe.

The mountain is north of the wild Torridon Hills, and offers magnificent views from its summit.

References

Mountains and hills of the Northwest Highlands
Marilyns of Scotland
Corbetts